The Thailand women's national under-23 volleyball team represents the Thailand for the under-23 and 22 level in international volleyball competitions. It is managed by the Thailand Volleyball Association.

Competition history

U23 World Championship
 Champions   Runners-up   Third place   Fourth place

U23 Asian Championship
 Champions   Runners-up   Third place   Fourth place

Current squad 
The following is the Thai roster in the 2017 FIVB Women's U23 World Championship.

Statistics
Updated after 2017 World Championship

Record against selected opponents
Record against opponents in Asian Championships and World Championships (as of 17 September 2017):

  1–0
  0–1
  0–1
  0–5
  1–0
  1–1
  0–1
  1–0
  1–0
  1–0
  0–1
  1–2
  1–0
  1–0
  1–0
  1–0
  1–0
  0–1
  1–0
  1–0
  1–1

See also

 Thailand women's national volleyball team
 Thailand men's national under-23 volleyball team
 Thailand women's national under-20 volleyball team
 Thailand women's national under-18 volleyball team

External links
Official website
FIVB profile

U
National women's under-23 volleyball teams 
Women's volleyball in Thailand